The Anthony and Caroline Isermann House is located in Kenosha, Wisconsin, United States. Designed in the Prairie School by a student of Frank Lloyd Wright, it was added to the National Register of Historic Places in 2004.

History
The Anthony and Caroline Isermann House was constructed in Kenosha, Wisconsin in 1922. Anthony Isermann was President of the Isermann Clothing Store in downtown Kenosha. The house was designed by Russell Barr Williamson, a student of Frank Lloyd Wright. Williamson briefly supervised Wright's projects in Milwaukee, and after he left Wright's practice, he focused his career on the city.
 The house was designed in the Prairie School style, which emphasizes horizontal lines. The home passed to Anthony and Caroline's daughter Mary and her husband James Fargo in 1955. Anthony Isermann lived in the house until the early 1960s. The house neighbors the Frank and Jane Isermann House, which belonged to Anthony's brother. The house was recognized by the National Park Service with a listing on the National Register of Historic Places on February 25, 2004.

The house has many features typical of the Prairie School. It has overhanging eaves under a low-pitched roof, belt courses, and banded windows. The small, two-story house has a rectangular plan and a one-story ell. The walls are mainly brown brick, though the upper half of the second story is faced with stucco. The main block has a large window, which is flanked by sidelights. Around these is a plain stone surround. The ell, on the south wall, has two shallow bays. Small sections of brick walls with stucco edges decoratively project from some portions of the house.

References

Houses in Kenosha County, Wisconsin
Houses completed in 1922
Houses on the National Register of Historic Places in Wisconsin
Prairie School architecture in Wisconsin
National Register of Historic Places in Kenosha County, Wisconsin